Heemstede is a town and a municipality in the Netherlands, in the province of North Holland. It is the fourth richest municipality of the Netherlands.

History 
Heemstede formed around the Castle Heemstede that was built overlooking the Spaarne River around 1286. Before 1296, Floris V, Count of Holland, granted Heemstede as a fiefdom to Reinier of Holy. During the 14th century, a village formed near the castle, which was destroyed and rebuilt several times in this period. A resident of this castle was Adriaan Pauw, who bought it in 1620. In 1653, Bennebroek split off from Heemstede, becoming a separate fiefdom.

Growth was slow, and in 1787 Heemstede counted 196 families. Even at that early date Heemstede had already gained the reputation it has today, of being primarily a "bedroom community" for the cities of Haarlem and Amsterdam. Wealthy city families left the cities in the summer, escaping "canal fever" which caused illness from the putrid canals. As a result, many estates were built in the 17th and 18th centuries, some of which (partially) remain until today such as Oud-Berkenroede, Berkenrode, Ipenrode, Huis te Manpad, Hartekamp, Bosbeek, Meer en Bosch, Meer en Berg, and Gliphoeve.

In 1857, the municipality Berkenrode was merged with Heemstede. In 1927, the northern portion of Heemstede, including a large part of the Haarlem Forest, was in turn added to the city of Haarlem.

Monuments and parks 
Groenendaal park: Designed by John Hope, it was formed by merging several country estates into one.
Vrijheidsbeeld (Freedom Statue), statue by Mari Andriessen to celebrate freedom and commemorate Heemstede victims of the Dutch Revolt. Located on the Vrijheidsdreef in Groenendaal park.
Slot Heemstede: The site of the Heemstede castle.
Hartekamp: Heemstede summer home of George Clifford, who hired Linnaeus to write his 'Hortus Cliffortianus', a detailed catalogue of the plant specimens in the herbarium and gardens of Hartecamp. George Clifford's house is closed to the public, but the surrounding gardens are used as a campus and are open to visitors.
Linnaeusbos (Linnaeus Forest): Originally a part of Hartekamp that was planted by George Clifford and documented by Linnaeus. In 2007, Heemstede celebrated Linnaeus's 300th birthday.
De Naald: The 'needle' is a monument placed by D.J. van Lennep to honor Witte van Haemstede, the savior of Haarlem at a battle which on April 26, 1304 and to honor the wounded of another battle fought against the Spanish on July 8, 1573. Both battles supposedly took place right at the corner of David Jacob van Lennep's house Huis te Manpad, where the monument stands.

Transport
The town is served by Heemstede-Aerdenhout railway station, which lies on the Oude Lijn between Haarlem and Leiden.

Local government 

The municipal council of Heemstede consists of 21 seats, which are divided as follows:

 Heemsteeds Burger Belang HBB - 5 seats
 VVD - 5 seats
 D66 - 4 seat
 GroenLinks - 3 seats
 CDA - 2 seats
 PvdA - 2 seats

Notable residents 

 Adriaan Pauw (1585–1653) bought the town in 1621, Grand Pensionary of Holland 1631 to 1636
 Jan Hope (1737–1784) a Dutch banker, summered in his Groenendaal Park 1767 to 1784
 Christiaan van Pol (1752–1813) a flower painter and teacher
 Thomas Hope (1769–1830/1831) a Dutch and British merchant banker, author, philosopher and art collector 
 Ivan Smirnov (1895–1956) a Russian WWI flying ace and naturalized Dutch aviator, lived in Heemstede 1936-1947
 Johan Limpers (1915–1944) Dutch sculptor and WWII resistance fighter
 Jan Knappert (1927-2005) an Esperantist and expert on the Swahili language
 Pieter Kooijmans (1933-2013) Dutch politician, jurist and diplomat
 Jan Gmelich Meijling (1936–2012) a Dutch politician and naval officer
 Els Moor (1937 – 9 March 2016) was a Dutch-born Surinamese educator, editor and book publisher
 Astrid Schulz (born 1939) a Dutch model and actress, Playboy Playmate of the Month in September 1964
 Gijs Kuenen (born 1940) a Dutch microbiologist and academic
 Mieke Bal (born 1946) a Dutch cultural theorist, video artist and academic
 Joost Swarte (born 1947) a Dutch cartoonist and graphic designer
 Dick Maas (born 1951) a Dutch film director, screenwriter and film producer
 Floortje Dessing (born 1970) a Dutch radio and TV presenter, producer and travel writer
 Thierry Baudet (born 1983) Dutch politician and leader of the Forum for Democracy
 Julian Ras - Dutch Wiki (born 2001) a Dutch actor

Sport 
 Joop van Dort (1889–1967) a footballer, team bronze medallist at the 1920 Summer Olympics
 Roepie Kruize (1925-1992)  field hockey player and coach, team bronze medallist at the 1948 Summer Olympics and team silver medallist at the 1952 Summer Olympics
 Johan Neeskens (born 1951) a Dutch former footballer with 480 club caps and manager
 Annemieke Fokke (born 1967) a Dutch field hockey player, team bronze medallist at the 1988 Summer Olympics
 Jeroen Bleekemolen (born 1981) a Dutch professional racing driver
 Frank Korpershoek (born 1984) a Dutch professional footballer, 351 caps with SC Telstar

Image gallery

References

External links 

 Official website

 
Municipalities of North Holland
Populated places in North Holland